Edgecumbe Bay is a bay in the Whitsunday Region, Queensland, Australia.

Geography 

It is located between Cape Edgecumbe and Cape Gloucester and is part of the Coral Sea.

History 
The bay was named by Lieutenant James Cook on 4 June 1770 in honour of George Edgcumbe, 1st Earl of Mount Edgcumbe.

References

Bays of Queensland
North Queensland